Secobarbital/brallobarbital/hydroxyzine was a combination tablet containing 50 mg brallobarbital, 150 mg secobarbital and 50 mg hydroxyzine that was used as a sedative. It was sold under the brand name Vesparax.  This drug has been withdrawn from the market in most countries.

Hydroxyzine and secobarbital lengthen the half-life of brallobarbital.  Because of this long half-life, it has symptoms resembling a hangover on the next day.

Jimi Hendrix was under the influence of Vesparax when he died of asphyxia due to aspiration of vomit on 18 September 1970.

References

Further reading 

 

Sedatives
Combination drugs